The 2016 Malaysian motorcycle Grand Prix was the seventeenth round of the 2016 MotoGP season. It was held at the Sepang International Circuit in Sepang on 30 October 2016.

Classification

MotoGP

The race, originally scheduled for 20 laps, was shortened to 19 laps after the start was delayed by 20 minutes due to torrential rain.

Moto2 race report
In the Moto2 class, Johann Zarco successfully defended the Moto2 title, thus becoming the first Moto2 rider to win two Moto2 title and the first since Jorge Lorenzo in 2007 to win a back-to-back intermediate class title.

Moto2

 Julian Simon withdrew from the event after suffering a broken vertebrae in a crash during Friday free practice.

Moto3

The race, originally scheduled for 18 laps, was red-flagged on lap 15 after Maria Herrera crashed into the back of Livio Loi in Turn 15. Since two thirds of the original distance required to award full points was completed, the race was not restarted. Maria Herrera was not classified in the final results since she failed to recover her bike into pit-lane within five minutes of the race being red-flagged (as required by the rules).

 Hiroki Ono withdrew from the event following a concussion suffered in a crash during qualifying.
 Fabio Spiranelli was injured in a scooter crash during a track familiarisation run on Thursday prior to the race and withdrew from the event after the opening Friday practice session.

Championship standings after the race (MotoGP)
Below are the standings for the top five riders and constructors after round seventeen has concluded.

Riders' Championship standings

Constructors' Championship standings

 Note: Only the top five positions are included for both sets of standings.

References

2016 MotoGP race reports
Motorcycle Grand Prix
2016
Malaysian motorcycle Grand Prix